Jacques Dessemme (16 September 1925 – 23 March 2019) was a French basketball player. He competed in the men's tournament at the 1952 Summer Olympics.

References

External links
 

1925 births
2019 deaths
People from Valserhône
French men's basketball players
Olympic basketball players of France
Basketball players at the 1952 Summer Olympics
Sportspeople from Ain
1954 FIBA World Championship players
1950 FIBA World Championship players